Simon Birch is a 1998 American comedy-drama film loosely based on the 1989 novel A Prayer for Owen Meany by John Irving and written for the screen and directed by Mark Steven Johnson in his directorial debut. The film stars Ian Michael Smith, Joseph Mazzello, Jim Carrey, Ashley Judd, and Oliver Platt. It omitted much of the latter half of the novel and altered the ending.

The film does not share the book's title at Irving's request; he did not believe that his novel could successfully be made into a film. The name "Simon Birch" was suggested by him to replace that of Owen Meany. The opening credits of the film state that it was "suggested by" Irving's novel.  The main plot centers on 12-year-old Joe Wenteworth and his best friend Simon Birch, who was born with dwarfism.

Plot 
On an autumn morning, an adult Joe Wenteworth visits the grave of his childhood friend Simon Birch and narrates Simon's story as the film transitions to the 1960s.

In 1952, Simon is the smallest newborn in the history of Gravestown. As a kid, he loves baseball even though he almost never gets to play during Little League, and when he does, it’s only to get a walk from his abnormally small strike zone. Joe's mother, Rebecca Wenteworth, got pregnant when she was in high school. The only fact anyone knows about Joe's parentage is that Rebecca met his father on a train. Her refusal to reveal the identity of the father has made Joe a subject of rumors and gossip. Simon is obsessed with how long he can hold his breath underwater, always trying to improve this ability.

One day Rebecca invites drama teacher Ben Goodrich over for dinner. He meets Joe and Simon and brings a stuffed armadillo for Joe. Simon expresses his belief that the niceties of church aren’t necessary. In front of the congregation, he says that if God has made niceties a priority, they are in trouble. Sunday School teacher Leavey belittles Simon, telling him that he doesn't belong in church and his belief that God has a special plan for him is ridiculous.

While playing baseball, Simon Birch is given the perfect pitch, and hits it. It soon becomes a foul ball that hits Rebecca in the head, immediately killing her. Simon gives Joe his most prized possession, his baseball cards, as an apology. Simon and Joe have an argument, with Simon claiming that everything he does is foreordained. Joe disagrees, believing that his mother's death was simply an accident. Joe's grandmother informs him that there must be a plan should she die, as Rebecca never told anyone who Joe's father was, even in confidence. Joe decides his only hope is to find his real father.

Joe and Simon believe that Joe's father may have taken the baseball. They break into the gym teacher's office to find if he has the baseball that killed Rebecca, as that would implicate him as Joe's father. It isn't there, and Joe vandalizes the office, believing that he will never find his real father. The police chief agrees to let them off if they go to the children's retreat over their winter break. Ben picks them up from the police station and takes them for ice cream. Simon informs Ben of his destiny to be a hero, but admits that he doesn't know what that will imply. However, he fears that it could happen at any time, and he could miss it.

A Christmas pageant with a Nativity play is organized by the Sunday School. Marjorie, the school's prettiest girl, is chosen to play the Virgin Mary; the acrophobic Howard is chosen as the angel; Simon is cast as the baby Jesus, as he is the only one who fits in the manger. Despite his reluctance, Simon happily accepts when he realizes that he will be able to stay next to Marjorie for the entire play. Simon helps another child tame his fear and mentions that children listen to him because of how he looks. However, the play proves disastrous as the turtle doves look like winged mutant turtles, the wise men cannot remember the words to "We Three Kings", and Howard's acrophobia causes him to forget his lines. It soon escalates to chaos when Simon, incited by seeing Marjorie's cleavage, makes a move on her. When Joe attempts to rescue Marjorie and stop Simon, she hits him, while Howard vomits on the stage.

As a result of the pageant chaos, Simon is not allowed on the retreat and his baseball cards are taken away. However, he breaks into the reverend's office to get them back, inadvertently finding the fateful baseball implicating the man as Joe's father. Simon has Ben drive him to the retreat to inform Joe. At the retreat, Reverend Russell admits to Joe he is his father, just as Simon arrives with the baseball.

While Simon and Joe are riding the bus home, it crashes into a lake. When the bus driver abandons the children and the reverend is knocked unconscious, Simon takes command to get everyone out safely. With the help of Joe, Simon is successful evacuating almost everyone, but he nearly drowns while he is saving the last child. Joe wakes up in the hospital and visits Simon, who is dying. Simon mentions that the children listened to him because of how he looks, that the window he escaped through was "just his size" and that he held his breath for "200 Mississippi", then dies. Joe remarks that he will always remember Simon for the hero that he was.

Joe's grandmother dies that summer, and he is adopted by Ben Goodrich just before his 13th birthday. The film then transitions back to the present day with adult Joe at Simon Birch's grave. Joe's son, who is named after Simon Birch, reminds him that he has a soccer game, and they drive away.

Cast 
 Ian Michael Smith as Simon Birch
 Joseph Mazzello as Joe Wenteworth, Simon's best friend
 Jim Carrey as Adult Joe Wenteworth / Narrator
 Ashley Judd as Rebecca Wenteworth, Joe's mother
 Oliver Platt as Ben Goodrich, Joe's adoptive father
 David Strathairn as Reverend Russell
 Dana Ivey as Grandmother Wenteworth, Joe's grandmother
 Beatrice Winde as Hilde Grove
 Jan Hooks as Miss Agnes Leavey
 Cecilley Carroll as Marjorie
 Sumela-Rose Keramidopulos as Ann
 Sam Morton as Stuart
 John Mazzello as Simon Wenteworth, Joe's son
 Holly Dennison as Mrs. Birch, Simon's mother
 Peter MacNeill as Mr. Birch, Simon's father
 Thomas J. Burns as Simon Birch Stunt Double

Production

Casting 
The role of Simon Birch was Ian Michael Smith's first role in film, and he has not done film acting since. Smith was chosen because of his small height, due to Morquio syndrome. A hospital worker in Chicago suggested Smith try out for a role in the film The Mighty, another film that called for a character with Morquio syndrome. When Smith didn't get the part, the director of The Mighty recommended Smith to Mark Steven Johnson whom he knew was searching for an actor to play the titular role in an Owen Meany adaptation. After Smith’s parents read through the novel A Prayer for Owen Meany they agreed to let him work on the film.

Sandra Bullock was originally cast in the role of Rebecca Wenteworth.

Locations 
The bus crash scene was filmed near Ontario's French River. The film's quarry scenes were shot at Elora, Ontario. The church featured in many parts of the film is in Lunenburg, Nova Scotia. Its black borders were painted white for the film. At the end of the film when it switches to the future, the borders are black. The baseball scene as well as many indoor scenes were filmed in Glen Williams, Ontario.

Soundtrack 
Simon Birch features R&B songs from the 1950 and 1960s, as well as four score cues by Marc Shaiman. The film's original motion picture soundtrack was released on compact disc, LP and audio cassette on September 1, 1998, through Sony Wonder, Hollywood Records and Epic Records featuring the following songs:

 "You Were There" – Babyface
 "Bread and Butter" – The Newbeats
 "A Walkin' Miracle" – The Essex
 "Mickey's Monkey" – Smokey Robinson / The Miracles
 "Can I Get a Witness" – Marvin Gaye
 "Fever" – Peggy Lee
 "Up on the Roof" – The Drifters
 "Papa's Got a Brand New Bag (Part 1)" – James Brown
 "The Nitty Gritty" – Shirley Ellis
 "Nowhere to Run" – Martha and the Vandellas
 "It's All Right" – The Impressions
 "(Your Love Keeps Lifting Me) Higher and Higher" – Jackie Wilson
 "Simon's Theme" – Marc Shaiman
 "Friends Forever" – Marc Shaiman
 "Simon's Birth" – Marc Shaiman
 "Life Goes On" – Marc Shaiman

Reception 
Simon Birch holds a 44% rating on Rotten Tomatoes, with the site's consensus calling the film "Overly mushy; tries too hard to pull at the heart-strings." On Metacritic, the film has a 39/100 rating, indicating "generally unfavorable reviews."  Movie critic Gene Siskel rated it the 7th best movie of 1998. Audiences polled by CinemaScore gave the film an average grade of "A" on an A+ to F scale.

The film opened at #5 at the North American box office making $3,321,370 in its opening weekend. The film would go on to gross $18,253,415 domestically, against a $20 million budget.

Home media 
The film was released on stereo dts LaserDisc format as well as VHS and DVD on May 18, 1999 (Region 1). The region 1 DVD contains a theatrical trailer for this film.

References

External links 

 
 
 
 
 
 
 The Bell Ringer in Simon Birch
 Hide & Seek Foundation for Lysosomal Disease Research

1998 films
1998 comedy-drama films
American buddy comedy-drama films
American coming-of-age comedy-drama films
1990s English-language films
Films directed by Mark Steven Johnson
1990s buddy comedy-drama films
Films based on works by John Irving
Films set in 1964
Films set in Maine
Films set in the 1960s
Films shot in Toronto
Films shot in Nova Scotia
Caravan Pictures films
Hollywood Pictures films
Films produced by Laurence Mark
Films produced by Roger Birnbaum
Films scored by Marc Shaiman
Films with screenplays by Mark Steven Johnson
1998 directorial debut films
Films about mother–son relationships
1990s coming-of-age comedy-drama films
1990s American films
Films about disability